Helga Glöckner-Neubert (5 September 1938 – 27 August 2017) was a German writer.

Life 
She then studied German and Slavic Studies. Afterwards she was a lecturer for Russian language at the University of Leipzig. The centre of her life was Frankfurt (Oder), which is reflected in various city-related publications. With her husband, the composer Gottfried Glöckner, she created an extensive body of songs. She was a member of the Deutscher Schriftstellerverband.

Glöckner-Neubert died in  aged 78.

Work 
 Festumzug – 725 Jahre Frankfurt. Frankfurt an der Oder 1978.
 Windkinder. , Berlin 1979.
 Frankfurt (Oder), Brockhaus-Verlag, Leipzig 1980.
 Das kleine Haus mit Mann und Maus. Kinderbuchverlag Berlin, 1989, .
 Stadtbilder aus Frankfurt. Stadt-Bild-Verlag, Berlin 1992, .
 Alle Wege bin ich abgegangen. Verlag Die Furt, 2012, .
 published after 27 August 2017: Auf dem Weg zu Dir; volume of poems (summary of all poems that have not yet appeared in the volume "Alle Wege bin ich abgegangen"; compiled by Gottfried Glöckner)

References

External links
 

1938 births
2017 deaths
People from Zwickau (district)
20th-century German women writers
German children's writers